Herbert Henry Charles Thurston  (15 November 1856 – 3 November 1939) was an English priest of the Roman Catholic Church, a member of the Jesuit order, and a prolific scholar on liturgical, literary, historical, and spiritual matters.  In his day, he was regarded as an expert on spiritualism.  Today he is remembered chiefly for his extensive contributions to the Catholic Encyclopedia.

Life
Herbert Thurston was born in London and educated at Stonyhurst College. He later received a bachelor's degree from London University. Thurston entered the Society of Jesus (the Jesuits) and worked as a master at Beaumont College from 1880 to 1887.  Ordained as a priest in 1890, he served as headmaster of Wimbledon College for a single term in 1893–94.

Writing
Thurston's writing career spanned over sixty years. As a liturgical scholar, he first became known for his writings on rubrics. Thurston wrote more than 150 articles for the Catholic Encyclopedia (1907–1914), and published nearly 800 articles in magazines and scholarly journals, as well a dozen books. He also re-edited Alban Butler's Lives of the Saints (1926–1938).  Many of Thurston's articles show a skeptical attitude towards popular legends about the lives of the saints and holy relics.  On the other hand, his treatment of spiritualism and the paranormal was regarded as "too sympathetic" by some within the Catholic community.

Father Thurston joined the Society for Psychical Research in 1919, and he was a friend of psychical researcher Everard Feilding.  Thurston attributed the phenomena of stigmata to the effects of suggestion. He criticized Spiritualism for its confidence that mediums communicate with the dead. He believed that "some ‘communications’ may originate in the medium's subconscious, while many alleged communications appear to be self-contradictory."

He was also a close friend of Father George Tyrrell, a fellow Jesuit priest who was sanctioned by the Catholic Church for his Modernist theological opinions. Thurston died in London in 1939.

Selected publications
Madame Blavatsky and The Jubilee of Theosophy (The Month, 1926)
Modern Spiritualism (1928)
The Church and Spiritualism (1933)
The Physical Phenomena of Mysticism (1952)
Ghosts And Poltergeists (1953)
Surprising Mystics (1955)

References

Further reading
Eric Dingwall. (1951). Reviews. Journal of the Society for Psychical Research 36: 718–723.

1856 births
1939 deaths
19th-century English Roman Catholic priests
20th-century English Roman Catholic priests
20th-century English Jesuits
19th-century English Jesuits
Jesuits from London
Contributors to the Catholic Encyclopedia
Parapsychologists